Muzammil Akhtar Shabbir (born 14 January 1969) is a Pakistani jurist who has been Justice of the Lahore High Court since 26 November 2016.

Judicial career
Justice Shabbir was inducted into Lahore High Court (LHC) as an additional Judge on 26 November 2016. He became permanent Judge of the LHC on 22 October 2018. Before elevation to the bench he was serving as Deputy Attorney General for Pakistan prior to that he remained the Secretary Lahore High Court Bar Association which is the biggest and oldest Bar Association of Pakistan.

References

Judges of the Lahore High Court
Pakistani judges
Place of birth missing (living people)
1969 births
Living people